Amarna Letter EA7 is a letter of correspondence between Napḫurureya, king of Egypt, and Burra-Buriyaš the king of Karaduniyaš, and is part of a series of correspondences from Babylonia to Egypt, which run from EA2 to EA4 and EA6 to EA14. EA1 and EA5 are from Egypt to Babylonia. 

The letter demonstrates the existence of Middle Eastern trade routes through Palestine.

The artifact is no longer extant having been destroyed during a bombing raid upon the city of Berlin, during World War II.

William L. Moran gave EA7 the title A lesson in geography. 

The letter reads (translation by Oppenheim):

See also
Amarna letters: EA 1, EA 2, EA 3, EA 4, EA 5, EA 6, EA 8, EA 9, EA 10, EA 11

References

Amarna letters